Rapped in Remixes: The Greatest Hits Remixed is a remix album by American hip hop trio Salt-N-Pepa. It includes remixed versions of songs taken from their three studio albums, Hot, Cool & Vicious, A Salt with a Deadly Pepa  and Blacks' Magic.
It is the third compilation released by the group in as many years and second remix album after their 1990 album, A Blitz of Salt-n-Pepa Hits.

Singles 
"Expression (Hard Ecu Edit)" was released as a single, peaking at number 23 in Ireland and the United Kingdom.

Track listing 

 "The Essential Hit Combination" is a megamix containing "My Mic Sounds Nice", "Expression", Do You Want Me", "Let's Talk About Sex" and "You Showed Me".

Charts

Personnel
Remixes
Cameron Paul (track 1)
Ben Liebrand (track 2, 6, 8)
Blacksmith (track 3)

References

1992 remix albums
Salt-N-Pepa albums
Next Plateau Entertainment albums